Shipwrecked is a 1990 family action-adventure film directed by Nils Gaup and starring Stian Smestad and Gabriel Byrne. The film is a dramatization of Norwegian author Oluf Falck-Ytter's book Haakon Haakonsen: En Norsk Robinson (Haakon Haakonsen: A Norwegian Robinson).

The movie was produced by a consortium of Scandinavian companies and released in the US in an English-language version by Walt Disney Pictures.

Plot
Haakon Haakonsen (Stian Smestad), a young Norwegian boy in the 1850s, becomes the sole support of his family as a cabin boy on a ship after his father is injured. Jens (Trond Peter Stamsø Munch), who was a shipmate of Haakon's father and a friend of the Haakonsens, agrees to be a "sea daddy" to Haakon, teaching him seamanship and acting as an older brother during their voyage.

At first, Haakon has a difficult time adjusting to life at sea, but eventually earns the respect of his shipmates. After shore-leave in London, a British naval officer, Lt. Howell, joins the crew ostensibly to provide protection from pirates.  Unbeknownst to the crew, he is actually a notorious pirate named John Merrick, who has murdered the real Howell and taken his identity. Haakon learns that "Howell" has secretly brought guns onto the ship, and Howell attempts to persuade Haakon not to say anything about the guns to the captain.

After the mysterious death of the admired captain (who had been poisoned by Howell's first mate), Howell assumes command.  Upon arriving in Sydney, shore-leave is abruptly cancelled and a suspicious new batch of sailors come on board. After departing Australia, Haakon discovers a stowaway (Louisa Milwood-Haigh) named Mary who turns into a love interest. Work on board ship soon becomes terrible for Haakon, Jens, and the original sailors, which intensifies when the new captain finds Mary and demands whoever has been fraternizing with her to show his face. Haakon admits responsibility, and the captain sentences him to be lashed with the cat o'nine tails. Jens protests, saying that whipping Haakon would be an effective death penalty, to which Howell orders that Jens will administer the punishment to Haakon instead of Howell. However,  the court martial is interrupted by a terrible storm that damages the mainmast, then sinks the ship. Haakon manages to rescue Mary from the brig but in the confusion is separated from the crew and wakes alone up on a deserted tropical island.

After searching the island, Haakon discovers treasure as well as wanted posters for an English pirate named Merrick (Gabriel Byrne), who looks identical to Howell. (In the first scene of the film, the real Howell was murdered by Merrick, who then stole the identity as a doppelganger). Haakon discovers that the suspicious shipmates (i.e. the new batch of abusive shipmates who were brought on after Merrick's captaincy) are really pirates, who stored the treasure during a hot pursuit from naval forces, and will soon return to the island to extract their loot.

Following a self-training with a sword and gun, Haakon manages to use a horn when a gorilla attacks. This makes the gorilla docile, who then starts to befriend Haakon, behaving like a pet. Haakon devises a set of booby traps anticipating that the pirates will soon return for their treasure.  Although Haakon adjusts to the island, he misses Jens, and more so his family back in Norway. One day, Haakon sees smoke from a distant island and tries various attempts to get there on a raft of his own.

Upon successfully arriving there, he finds a village of natives doing a night dance. Haakon encounters Mary in the middle of an altercation with several of the natives.  Misinterpreting the situation, Haakon reveals himself and frightens the natives with a gunshot until he backs into Jens, who explains that the natives are peaceful and saved his and Mary's lives.  The reunited trio happily depart for Haakon's island the next day.

Shortly thereafter, the three friends witness the arrival of the pirates along with Berg and Steine (Knut Walle and Harald Brenna), two of Jens' friends who survived the sinking ship and are being held prisoner.  After Haakon's traps fail to work, he quickly devises a plan to save their friends.  At night, Mary sneaks aboard the ship and frees the remaining crew who manage to overpower their pirate guards and retake the ship.  Meanwhile, on land, Haakon and Jens manage to distract the pirates long enough to free Berg and Steine and narrowly make it back to the ship, stranding the pirates on the island.  Haakon, Jens, Mary and the liberated crew return to their native Norway. Each man keeps a small share of the treasure, with Haakon deciding to use his share to get his impoverished family out of debt.

Back home in Norway, Haakon reunites with his family and introduces them to Mary. His parents agree to take her in until she can reestablish contact with her own relatives.

Cast of characters
 Haakon Haakonson (Stian Smestad) - A Norwegian youth who signs on as cabin boy aboard a ship whose captain is his father's close friend. At first he is shy and timid from years of being teased and picked on because he is poor, but after being stranded alone on the island and forced to survive, he becomes more confident.
 John Merrick (Gabriel Byrne) - The pirate captain who poses as a member of the English military, he eventually takes over the ship Haakon is on after the original captain mysteriously dies and proceeds to make life difficult for everyone. 
 Jens (Trond Peter Stamsø Munch) - The family friend of Haakon's family and a sailor. He sailed with Haakon's father and considers himself Haakon's guardian on the ship after promising Haakon's father to look out for him. 
 Mary (Louisa Milwood-Haigh) - A young stowaway searching for her uncle in Calcutta. She escaped from a workhouse in Australia, where she was placed after the death of her parents. 
 Berg (Knut Walle) - One of Jens' shipmates.
 Steine (Harald Brenna) - One of Jens' shipmates.
 The Captain (Kjell Stormoen)

Production
The original 1873 Norwegian novel, aimed at young readers, was inspired by another adventure classic, Daniel Defoe's 1719 novel Robinson Crusoe.

The film was shot on location in Fiji, Norway, Spain and the United Kingdom in July to October 1989.

In the original version of the film, the Norwegian characters speaks Norwegian to each other and English to English characters, while the English characters speaks English only. In the international version, all lines in Norwegian are dubbed over in English, in most cases by the Norwegian actors themselves.

Reception
The film received favorable reviews as a well-made adventure movie for all ages.

Awards
Shipwrecked was nominated for three Young Artist Awards in 1992: 
 Best Family Motion Picture — Drama
 Best Young Actor Starring in a Motion Picture — Stian Smestad
 Best Young Actress Co-starring in a Motion Picture — Louisa Haigh

External links
 
 
 
 
 Commonsensemedia.com review of Shipwrecked

Pirate films
1990 films
1990s children's adventure films
Walt Disney Pictures films
Norwegian adventure films
Norwegian-language films
English-language Norwegian films
Films directed by Nils Gaup
Films set in the 1850s
Films set in 1859
Films set in Norway
Films set in England
Films shot in Fiji
Films shot in Norway
Films shot in England
Films shot in Spain
Films based on Norwegian novels
Films scored by Patrick Doyle
Films based on Robinson Crusoe
Seafaring films
1990s English-language films